Barbara Valentin (born Ursula Ledersteger; 15 December 1940 – 22 February 2002) was an Austrian actress. She worked in film, often with Rainer Werner Fassbinder.

Biography
Valentin was born in 1940 as Ursula Ledersteger in Vienna, Austria. Her father was the Austrian art director, Hans Ledersteger and her mother the actress, Irmgard Alberti. She had a half-brother, Alfred Ledersteger. She was married to German film director Helmut Dietl. 

During the early to mid-1980s, Valentin was close friends with Freddie Mercury. She is featured in the music video for the Queen song, It's a Hard Life.

During her career, Valentin was nicknamed "the German Jayne Mansfield".

On 22 February 2002, Valentin died of a stroke in Munich, Germany at the age of 61. She was buried in the Ostfriedhof in Munich, Germany.

Selected filmography

References

External links

1940 births
2002 deaths
Austrian expatriates in Germany
Austrian film actresses
Austrian television actresses
Actresses from Vienna
20th-century Austrian actresses
Burials at the Ostfriedhof (Munich)